"All My Favorite Songs" is a song by the American rock band Weezer, released on January 21, 2021, as the first single from their fourteenth studio album OK Human. A music video was released on the same day.

An alternate version of the song, featuring indie pop band AJR, was released on May 12, 2021, five days after the release of their fifteenth studio album, Van Weezer.

Composition
The song begins with an introduction in A-flat major. After this, the song transitions to E major, which continues throughout the rest of the song. 

In contrast to the recent hard rock-oriented singles from Van Weezer, "All My Favorite Songs" is more of a baroque pop and chamber pop song. According to Spin, it is an "The orchestral pop-rock song is right in the Weezer wheelhouse, sounding like the logical next step in the evolution of Rivers Cuomo."

In regards to the song's title and lyrics, Cuomo stated that it reflects his music taste, by declaring "All my favorite songs are slow and sad."

Reception
Chris Deville at Stereogum gave the song a positive review, stating "The song strikes a pleasing balance between chipper music and melancholy lyrics, landing squarely in Weezer’s radio-friendly zone without feeling entirely corny or sterile." In a more divisive review, Clara V. Nguyen of The Harvard Crimson stated "Maybe viewing the orchestra as a dynamic and contemporary creative force, rather than a relic of the past, would help the band better integrate it into their work. “All My Favorite Songs” lingers somewhere between the 18th and 21st centuries, not quite knowing which it would rather inhabit."

Music video
A music video for the song was released on January 21, 2021. It was directed by Colin Read, and produced Pulse Films and Obra House.

Charts

Weekly charts

Year-end charts

References

2021 singles
Weezer songs
Baroque pop songs
Chamber pop songs
2021 songs
Songs written by Rivers Cuomo
Songs about music
Atlantic Records singles
Crush Management singles